Sir John St Aubyn, 5th Baronet (17 May 1758 – 10 August 1839), was a British Member of Parliament, High Sheriff of Cornwall and Grand Master of the Freemasons. Born in London, he succeeded to the baronetcy on 12 October 1772, at which point he inherited Clowance, the family's estate near Crowan, Cornwall.

Life
John St Aubyn was born on 17 May 1758 at Golden Square, London. His parents were Sir John St Aubyn, 4th Baronet, who was a Member of Parliament, and his wife, Elizabeth Wingfield; their daughter Catherine St Aubyn, two years John's junior, became an amateur artist. St Aubyn attended Westminster School between 1773 and 1777. He then spent three years in France, where he had a relationship with an Italian woman and had a daughter.

St Aubyn's father died on 12 October 1772, at which point St Aubyn succeeded to the baronetcy, inheriting Clowance, the family estate near Crowan, Cornwall. He was High Sheriff of Cornwall for 1780 and was then Member of Parliament for Truro in 1784, for Penryn from 1784 to 1790, and for Helston from 1807 to 1812. St Aubyn was also a well-known fossil collector, who in addition to his own collection purchased the large collection possessed by Richard Greene, surgeon of Lichfield (died 1793). He was elected a Fellow of the Royal Society in 1797.

The baronetcy became extinct on his death in August 1839, aged 81. His estate passed to his illegitimate son, James; his illegitimate son Edward was created a baronet in his own right in 1866, and was the ancestor of the Barons St Levan. He is buried at Crowan, with a monument carved by William Behnes.

References

External links 

 
Geological Society "Geoscientist magazine" – article about Sir John St Aubyn

1758 births
1839 deaths
Baronets in the Baronetage of England
Members of the Parliament of Great Britain for Truro
Members of the Parliament of Great Britain for Penryn
Members of the Parliament of the United Kingdom for Helston
British MPs 1784–1790
UK MPs 1807–1812
High Sheriffs of Cornwall
Fellows of the Royal Society
Burials in Cornwall